Judith McAra-Couper is a New Zealand academic and a professor of midwifery at Auckland University of Technology.

Biography
McAra-Couper completed a diploma in midwifery at Auckland University of Technology and spent five years working in a remote village in Bangladesh. She returned to New Zealand in 1996 and was appointed a midwifery lecturer at Auckland University of Technology. She completed a PhD in 2007 titled What is shaping the practice of health professionals and the understanding of the public in relation to increasing intervention in childbirth?. In 2009 McAra-Couper was employed by the World Health Organization to design and support midwifery training and education in Bangladesh.

In 2013 McAra-Couper was appointed head of the midwifery department at Auckland University of Technology. In November 2020 she was appointed full professor, effective 1 January 2021.

McAra-Couper has held positions on midwifery organisations, including chair of the Auckland region of the New Zealand College of Midwives from 2008 to 2011, and she was appointed to the Midwifery Council of New Zealand in 2010. In the following year she became chair of the council.

Selected works

References

External links 

 
 
 
 

Living people
Year of birth missing (living people)
New Zealand women academics
Auckland University of Technology alumni
Academic staff of the Auckland University of Technology
New Zealand midwives